Havana Marking is a British producer and director of documentary films. She is known for her first feature documantary in 2009 Afghan Star. This film won Best Director and the Audience Award at the 2009 Sundance Film Festival.

Plot

The film follows a season of the Afghan TV phenomenon, based on the X-Factor / American Idol. Marking lived in Kabul for five months and focused on four main contestants in the series. The film changed pitch at the moment that Setara Hussainzada (a young woman from Herat) danced during her final performance. This led to death threats, condemnation and the possibility that the show itself might be stopped. The film won The Grierson award for ‘best doc on a contemporary issue’, and the Prix Italia.

As co-director of Roast Beef Productions, Marking oversaw the development and production of a number of documentaries resulting in two Academy Award Nominations, seven Sundance Awards, and four EMMYs. By “growing up” in the world of TV, Roast Beef was able to leverage the medium’s popular sensibility and successfully apply it to the world of features. Films include: Afghan Star, Hell and Back Again, Smash & Grab, The Square, Pussy Riot: A Punk Prayer and Ashley Madison: Sex, Lies and Cyber Attacks. 

Marking has directed films for HBO (Silencing the Song), More4 (Vote Afghanistan!), the BBC (Secret History of the Family).  Her part-animated feature, Smash & Grab: the Story of the Pink Panthers, about Balkan diamond thieves Storyville, had a wide cinematic release in the US and was optioned by Danny Boyle (Currently on Amazon Prime). Her last feature, The Kleptocrats, aired on Starz and can be viewed in Itunes. 

She was Executive Producer on numerous films, notably To Hell and Back Again (dir Danfung Dennis), nominated for an Academy Award 2012, and Pussy Riot: A Punk Prayer. 

Finally her articles and photographs have been published in the Guardian, The Observer and the Telegraph.

Marking was born in England and moved to the United States as a child. Her father, Giles Marking, is a designer in London and he was an Architecture professor at the University of Washington. Stacy Marking, her mother, is a journalist, writer and business woman and was one of the first female television directors in the UK. She now  lives in London & Dorset with her daughter, Celia.

Filmography

References

External links

Havana Marking on Sundance.org

British film directors
British documentary film directors
Living people
Year of birth missing (living people)